Jalwandi Jamal (born 13 February 1993) is an Indonesian professional footballer who plays as a winger for Liga 3 club Persikota Tangerang.

Career

Persita Tangerang
On 19 May 2014, he made his debut and scored a goal in a 2–0 win against Persijap Jepara.

References

External links
 
 Player profil at goal.com

1993 births
Living people
Indonesian footballers
Liga 1 (Indonesia) players
Liga 2 (Indonesia) players
Persita Tangerang players
Cilegon United players
Sportspeople from Aceh
Association football midfielders